Edward  Dendy (bap. 1613–1674) was a regicide who helped to facilitate the trial of Charles I.

Dendy was the son of Edward Dendy, serjeant-at-arms. Dendy inherited his fathers position and served as serjeant-at-arms in the Long Parliament and for the Rump. On 8 January 1649 Dendy as serjeant-at-arms for the Rump Parliament proclaimed that the trial of Charles I would take place in London, and was rewarded on 27 March the same year with the post of serjeant-at-arms for the Council of State.

During the Interregnum he served the new regime in various roles and it was he who proclaimed Cromwell as protector in London on 19 December 1653.

In 1660, at the restoration of the monarchy he was excluded from the general pardon granted under the Act of Oblivion and fled abroad. In 1661, he left Rotterdam before the English ambassador George Downing could arrange for an arrest warrant to be issued. He moved to Switzerland to be with other republican fugitives. He remained there,  settling in Lausanne where he died in 1674.

Notes

References
Timothy Venning, ‘Dendy, Edward (bap. 1613, d. 1674)’, Oxford Dictionary of National Biography, Oxford University Press, Sept 2004; online edn, Jan 2008 accessed 1 Aug 2009 cites:
T. Mason, ed., A register of baptisms, marriages, and burials in the parish of St Martin in the Fields ... from 1550 to 1619, Harleian Society, register section, 25 (1898)
 W. B. Bannerman, ed., The registers of St Mary le Bowe, Cheapside, All Hallows, Honey Lane, and of St Pancras, Soper Lane, London, 2 vols., Harleian Society, register section, 44–5 (1914–15) 
 CSP Ire., 1660–62 
 CSP dom., 1649–55; 1659–61 
 E. Ludlow, A voyce from the watch tower, ed. A. B. Worden, CS, 4th ser., 21 (1978) 
 The memoirs of Edmund Ludlow, ed. C. H. Firth, 2 vols. (1894) 
 JHC, 2 (1640–42) 
 The journal of Sir Simonds D'Ewes from the beginning of the Long Parliament to the opening of the trial of the earl of Strafford, ed. Wallace Notestein (1923) 
 The diary of Bulstrode Whitelocke, 1605–1675, ed. R. Spalding, British Academy, Records of Social and Economic History, new ser., 13 (1990) 
 Bodl. Oxf., Godwin pamphlets no. 1040 
 A. M. Burke, ed., Memorials of St Margaret's Church, Westminster (1914)
 Archives: TNA: PRO, Protectorate Council of State records, petitions for pay arrears and relating to Irish lands, esp. Council papers for 14 June 1654, 11 May and 6 Sept 1655, 15 Feb 1656, in Council of State records for 1650s, SP 18

1613 births
1674 deaths
Regicides of Charles I
Serjeants-at-Arms of the House of Commons of England